Chidi Kwubiri (* 1966 in Umuahia, Nigeria) is a Nigerian-German visual artist.

Chidi Kwubiri was first a guest student in 1993 and shortly thereafter a regular student (painting) at the Kunstakademie Düsseldorf under Michael Buthe. After Buthe's death in 1994 he changed to the masterclass of A. R. Penck and left the Düsseldorf Art Academy in 2002 as a master class student of  A. R. Penck.

Since 2000 Kwubiri is living with his family in Pulheim near Cologne, where he has his studio at the WALZWERK, a converted historical industrial complex. Chidi Kwubiri has had numerous international solo and group exhibitions in Europe, Africa, the Middle East and the USA. In 2016 he designed the MISEREOR lenten veil, which has a tradition of over 40 years, for the global MISEREOR Lenten Campaigns 2017/2018

Exhibitions 
2020: 
 ”blue is hot and red is cold”, Klasse A.R.Penck, Galerie Frank Schlag, Essen, Germany
2019: 
 12th Florence Biennale, Italy
 ”a journey into contemporary AFRICAN ART”, Belvedere Art Space, Beirut, Lebanon
 ”Scattering The Lines – Connecting The Dots “, Cartoon Art Gallery, Dubai, U.A.E.
2018: 
 goodwill ambassador MISEREOR 2017/2018 “I am, because you are”
 „motionEmotion“, Gallery 1957, Accra/Ghana (s)
 „LebensWert Arbeit“, Dom-Museum Trier/Germany
2017: 
 arthouse auction, Lagos/Nigeria (also 2008 – 2016)
2015:	
 56th Venice Biennale – collateral “italia docet”/Italy
2014:	
 Casablanca Biennale/Morocco
2013:	
 residency Ifitry/Morocco
 “mother tongue“, temple muse, Lagos/Nigeria (s)
2012:	
 paragon gallery, Miami/USA
2010: 
 "theme Africa": Phillips de Pury, New York City, United States
2009/10: 
 "whip not child": art project against violence on kids (initiator) in co-operation with Deutsche Gesellschaft für Technische Zusammenarbeit (GTZ) and Goethe Institute, Nigeria/Germany
2009: 
 OPERA Gallery, Paris, France
2008: 
 "reflection", Signature Gallery, Lagos, Nigeria
 Millenia Fine Art, Orlando, Florida, USA
2007: 
 Goethe-Institute, Düsseldorf, Germany
 Neues Rathaus. Hannover, Germany
 "Zwei Schritte Voraus" (two steps ahead), Berlin
 Deutsche Gesellschaft für Technische Zusammenarbeit (GTZ), Eschborn, Germany
2006: 
 World Market Center, Las Vegas, USA
 Association for Visual Arts (AVA), Cape Town, South Africa
 Gallery ACHT P! PRAVATO, Bonn, Germany (also in 1998)
 Gallery OTT, Düsseldorf, Germany (s),(also in 2003, 2002 and 1997)
2005: 
 "back to the roots", Goethe Institute. Lagos, Nigeria (s)
 International Art Fair "Palm Beach Contemporary", Palm Beach, Florida, USA
 Kunsttage Rhein-Erft, Brauweiler Abbey, Germany (also in 2002 and 2001)
2004: 
 "The Internationals", Millenia Gallery, Orlando, Florida, USA
 Kunstverein Erftstadt, Altes Stadthaus, Erftstadt-Lechenich, Germany
 Collection National Museum, Tivat, Montenegro
 Second Independent International Biennial of Graphic in St. Petersburg, Russia
 Holland Art Fair, The Hague, Netherlands
2003: 
 International art fair "LINEART" (Gallery DE OPSTEKER), Ghent, Belgium
 "Far from the bush", Gallery De Opsteker, Amsterdam and Durgerdam, The Netherlands
2001: 
 Artists from Germany, Church Street Gallery, Orlando, Florida, USA 
 Landtag Nordrhein-Westfalen, Düsseldorf, Germany
2000: 
 Outdoor sculpture project, Skulpturenmeile, Steinhagen, Germany
 UNESCO Headquarters, Paris, France
1999: 
 Koelner Bank (two artists), Cologne, Germany
 Jakobskirche (Church of St Jacob), European Art Capital 1999, Weimar, Germany
 Dr. Georg Haar Foundation, European Art Capital 1999, Weimar, Germany
1998: 
 project "ConverArt", BICC (Bonn International Center for Conversion)
 Westfälisches Landesmuseum, Münster, Germany
 "art multiple", Düsseldorf, Germany
 Gallery Xenios, Frankfurt/Main, Germany
1993: 
 Hedwig and Robert Samuel Foundation, Düsseldorf, Germany; Art sponsorship awards (selection)

References

External links 
 KWUBIRI Chidi European Art - Opera Gallery, purchase and sale
 Chidi Kwubiri | Art Auction Results
 CHIDI KWUBIRI - The Fine Artist | afritopic®
 CHIDI KWUBIRI
 ART VENTURE AFRICA
 CHIDI KWUBIRI NIGHT OF PASSAGE 2009 OIL ON CANVAS 199.4 x 160 cm. (78.5 x 63 in.)
 CHIDI KWUBIRI (b. 1966) BACK TO LIFE 2010 ACRYLIC ON CANVAS 170 x 200 cm. (67 x 79 in.)
 Phillips de Pury & Company: CHIDI KWUBIRI, Busy Doing Nothing
 Chidi Kwubiri Auctions Results | Artnet

Living people
Nigerian artists
1966 births
People from Umuahia